The following are the list of Indonesian diplomats that served as Ambassador of the Republic of Indonesia to Singapore.
<onlyinclude>

See also 

 Embassy of Indonesia, Singapore
 List of Indonesian ambassadors
 List of diplomatic missions of Indonesia
 Indonesia–Singapore relations

Reference 

Ambassadors of Indonesia
Ambassadors of Indonesia to Singapore